Leonard Arthur Ardill  (15 March 1931 – 4 April 2014) was an Australian state politician, representing the Labor.

Following time as an Alderman in the Brisbane City Council, including serving as the Vice Mayor, Ardill was elected in 1986 to the Legislative Assembly of Queensland as the member for Salisbury. He then became the member for Archerfield from 1992 till his retirement in 1998 .

His parliamentary service included time as the Chairman of the Parliamentary Travelsafe Committee and membership of the Parliamentary Public Works Committee.

Ardill died in 2014 and was cremated at Mt Gravatt Crematorium.

References

1931 births
2014 deaths
Australian Labor Party members of the Parliament of Queensland
Members of the Queensland Legislative Assembly
People educated at Brisbane State High School